Edwin Monroe Stanley (March 9, 1909 – December 23, 1971) was a United States district judge of the United States District Court for the Middle District of North Carolina.

Education and career

Born in Forsyth County, North Carolina, Stanley received a Bachelor of Laws from Wake Forest University School of Law in 1931. He was in private practice of law in Greensboro, North Carolina from 1931 to 1954. He was a Judge of the Greensboro Juvenile Court from 1951 to 1954. He was the United States Attorney for the Middle District of North Carolina from 1954 to 1957.

Federal judicial service

Stanley received a recess appointment from President Dwight D. Eisenhower on October 23, 1957, to a seat on the United States District Court for the Middle District of North Carolina vacated by Judge Johnson Jay Hayes. Nominated to the same seat by President Eisenhower on January 13, 1958, Stanley was confirmed by the United States Senate on February 25, 1958, and received his commission on February 27, 1958. He served as Chief Judge from 1961 until his death on December 23, 1971.

References

Sources
 

1909 births
1971 deaths
Wake Forest University School of Law alumni
Judges of the United States District Court for the Middle District of North Carolina
United States district court judges appointed by Dwight D. Eisenhower
20th-century American judges
United States Attorneys for the Middle District of North Carolina
20th-century American lawyers
People from Forsyth County, North Carolina